Sherubtse College is the first accredited college in Bhutan, founded in 1966 by a group of Jesuits under the leadership of Father William Mackey. The college was affiliated to the University of Delhi by a special act of the Indian parliament.

It became a part of the newly created Royal University of Bhutan in 2003, a system that comprises all public post-secondary schools in Bhutan.

Sherubtse College is located in Kanglung under Trashigang district in east Bhutan. The college campus is spread over a large area. Sherubtse College is only 10 minutes drive from the Yongphulla domestic airport.

Departments
Nearly 300 students graduate every year from the college. It offers courses such as Economics,  Computer Science, Dzongkha, English, Geography, and Science.  Its most significant science department is the department of Botany and Environmental Science, which benefits from its location amidst the rich biodiversity of the Himalayan regions.
Now business studies has been shifted to Gaedu College of Business Studies(GCBS) which is the second government college in Bhutan and is located in Gedu under Chhukha dzongkhag. This new college offers courses like Business Administration and Commerce.

History of the College
The 3rd king of Bhutan, Jigme Dorji Wangchuck laid the foundation stone for Sherubtse School in June 1966.  The school opened in 1968 with Father William Mackey as principal.  In 1976 the school was upgraded to a Junior College with pre-university courses in science.  In 1978 the arts and business courses were added.

In July 1983, Sherubtse College became an affiliated college of the Delhi University system in India and Father Gerald E. Leclaire S.J. was the first principal. Several Jesuits of Canadian origin taught English and Science.

In June 2003 the school was combined with 9 other institutes of higher learning to form the Royal University of Bhutan.  The departments of business and economics are to be transferred to the Royal Institute of Management (RIM) over the next several years.

In literature
"Beyond the Sky and Earth" Jamie Zeppa provides a detailed account of her experiences teaching at Sherubtse College.

Notable alumni
Choida Jamtsho, Member of the National Assembly
Damcho Dorji, Foreign Minister
Sonam Kinga, Chairperson (National Council of Bhutan), Actor and Researcher at the Center for Bhutan Studies
Kezang Dorji, Rapper/Singer
Lotay Tshering, Prime Minister of Bhutan
Wangchuk Namgyel, Speaker, National Assembly of Bhutan
Sangay Khandu, Member of the National Council, representative of Gasa
Kelly Dorji, Film Actor

Notable faculty 
 William Mackey (Jesuit) Educator
 Jamie Zeppa Writer, Author of Beyond the Sky and Earth
 George Thengummoottil Filmmaker

See also
 List of Jesuit sites
 Sherubtse College website

References

 
Universities in Bhutan
Educational institutions established in 1966
1966 in Bhutan